Corning, New York is the name of two places in Steuben County, New York, although it most frequently means the City of Corning. 

Corning (city), New York
Corning (town), New York, adjacent to the city

See also
Corning (disambiguation), includes other places named "Corning"